Przylepki  is a village in the administrative district of Gmina Brodnica, within Śrem County, Greater Poland Voivodeship, in west-central Poland.

History
Przylepki was first documented in 1366. In 1581, it was located in the Kościan District, within the Poznań Voivodeship, Poland-Lithuania. From 1975 to 1998, Przylepki administratively belonged to Poznań Voivodeship.

Notable residents
Stanisław Egbert Koźmian (1811-1885), Polish writer, poet and translator.

References

Przylepki